José de Acosta (1539 or 1540 in Medina del Campo, Spain – February 15, 1600 in Salamanca, Spain) was a sixteenth-century Spanish Jesuit missionary and naturalist in Latin America. His deductions regarding the ill effects of crossing over the Andes in 1570 related to the atmosphere being too thin for human needs; a variety of altitude sickness is now referred to as Acosta's disease.

Life
José de Acosta was born at Medina del Campo in Spain, where his parents lived in this city of the plain, about twenty-four miles from Valladolid, in Old Castile, on the left bank of the swampy river Zapardiel, and overlooked by the old castle of La Mota. He was of converso background, His parents had five sons, Gerónimo, Christóval, José, Diego, and Bernardo. The Acosta brothers were fellow townsmen of the old soldier Bernal Diaz, who told the story of the conquest of Mexico, but they were many years younger than him. In 1553, at the age of thirteen, Acosta became a novice in the Society of Jesus in Medina del Campo. Four Acosta brothers joined this order. Before leaving Spain, José was lecturer in theology at Ocana, and in April 1569, was to be sent to Lima, Peru, where the Jesuits had been established in the proceeding year. According to one scholar, Acosta was "a heavy man of uncertain, melancholic temper."

Panama
At age 32, Acosta left Spain with several other Jesuits in 1570, landing at Cartagena de Indias, and finally at Nombre de Dios, then journeyed through 18 leagues – about ) – of tropical forest. He was impressed by the scenery, the novel sights at every turn, and was interested, at Capira, in the clever antics of troops of monkeys. From Panama he embarked for Peru to pursue missionary work. He expected to experience unbearably intense heat in crossing the equator, but found it to be so cool in March, that he laughed at Aristotle and his philosophy.

Peru and Acosta's disease
On his arrival at Lima, he was ordered to cross the Andes, apparently to join the Viceroy of Peru in the interior. He took the route, with fourteen or fifteen companions, across the mountainous province of Huarochiri, and by the lofty pass of Pariacaca (over ), where the whole party suffered severely from the effects of the rarefied atmosphere.  Acosta describes these sufferings, which were to be repeated on the three other occasions of crossing the cordillera. Acosta was one of the earliest people to give a detailed description of altitude sickness, and to link it to "air... so thin and so delicate that it is not proportioned to human breathing", and a variety of altitude sickness is referred to as Acosta's disease. He also mentions an attack of snow blindness and the way in which an Indian woman cured him.

Acosta had arrived in Peru two years after Don Francisco de Toledo had come out as Viceroy in 1568. Following Toledo's beheading of the Inca Túpac Amaru, the Viceroy devoted five years to a tour through every part of the Viceroyalty of Peru, and to settlement of the country, in which he was aided by Acosta, the licentiate Polo de Ondegardo, and the Judge Juan Ortiz de Matienzo. Acosta also accompanied the Viceroy to Charcas, and was with him during his unsuccessful expedition against the fierce Chirihuana Indians.

The principal seat of the Jesuits was at that time in the little town of Juli, near the western shores of Lake Titicaca. Here a college was formed, the languages of the natives were studied, and eventually, a printing press was established. Acosta probably resided at Juli during much of his stay in Peru. It was here, in all likelihood, that he observed the famous comet of 1577, from November 1 to December 8, which extended like a fiery plume from the horizon nearly to the zenith. Here, too, he devoted much of his time to the preparation of several learned works, which he later took back to Spain in manuscript, including the first two books of the Natural History of the Indies. At Juli, Father Acosta received information respecting the Amazon River from a brother who had formerly been in the famous piratical cruise of Lope de Aguirre.

Towards the close of the viceroyalty of Toledo, Father Acosta appears to have moved from the interior of Peru to Lima. Here he mentions superintending the casting of a great bell, for which there was difficulty in getting fuel for the furnace, making it necessary to fell great trees in the Rímac River valley. Viceroy Toledo was practically the founder of the University of St. Mark at Lima, where Acosta was to occupy the chair of theology. Here he was again able to display his abilities as a famed orator.

In 1571 José went to Cuzco as a visitor of the recently founded college of the Jesuits. He returned to Lima three years later to again fill the chair of theology, and was elected provincial in 1576.

In 1579 Sir Francis Drake was on the coast, and the Viceroy dispatched a fleet under Pedro Sarmiento de Gamboa, partly to chase the English pirate, and partly to explore and survey the Strait of Magellan. Acosta had conversations with the pilot of Sarmiento's fleet, and was allowed to inspect his chart, thus obtaining much hydrographic information, and particulars respecting the tides in the straits. He also conversed with the new Viceroy Don Martín Henríquez on the same subject.

Acosta founded a number of colleges, among them those of Arequipa, Potosí, Chuquisaca, Panama and La Paz, but met with considerable opposition from the Viceroy Toledo. His official duties obliged him to investigate personally a very extensive range of territory, so that he acquired a practical knowledge of the vast province, and of its aboriginal inhabitants. At the 1582 session of the Third Council of Lima, Father Acosta played a very important part and was its historian. He delivered an eloquent and learned oration at its last sitting on October 18, 1583.

Mexico
Shortly after the Third Council of Lima, he embarked with all his manuscripts, the literary labors of fifteen years, and commenced his voyage to Mexico. During the passage, he was a shrewd observer of nature and knowledge seeker. He learned from an expert Portuguese pilot that there were four often-visited ports of no magnetic compass variation on the earth, and that one of them was Corvo Island in the Azores. Acosta landed at the port of Huatulco, at the western end of the Gulf of Tehuantepec, in the Oaxaca province, then journeyed by land to Mexico City, where he resided in 1586. He had opportunities of which he diligently availed himself for collecting information touching the civilization and religion of the Aztecs and natural products of this country. His chief informant respecting the rites and festivals of the Mexicans was brother and Prebendary, Juan de Tobar. For information on the Mexica, Acosta followed Juan de Tovar's Relación del origen de los indios que habitan esta Nueva España según sus historias, a possible summary of Fray Diego Durán's Historia de las Indias de Nueva España e islas de Tierra Firme—in turn derived in part from an anonymous Nahuatl history of Mexico-Tenochtitlan, known as the Crónica X.

Return to Spain
Acosta had been called to Spain by the King in 1585, prior to being detained in Mexico, in order to debate against Alonzo Sánchez's plans to initiate an invasion of China. He sailed home to Spain in the fleet of 1587, which contained a precious cargo, including twelve chests of gold each weighing , 11,000,000 pieces of silver, and two chests of emeralds each weighing 100 lb, in addition to loads of ginger, sarsaparilla, Brazil wood and animal hides. In Spain he filled the chair of theology at the Roman college in 1594, head of the Jesuits College at Valladolid, as well as other important positions. At the time of his death in his 60th year, he was rector of the college at Salamanca.

Works

The first two appeared at Salamanca in 1588, the last at Seville in 1590, and was soon after its publication translated into various languages. It is chiefly the  that has established the reputation of Acosta, as this was one of the first detailed and realistic descriptions of the New World. In a form more concise than that employed by his predecessors, Francisco Lopez de Gómara and Oviedo, he treated the natural and philosophic history of the New World from a broader point of view. In it, more than a century before other Europeans learned of the Bering Strait, Acosta hypothesized that Latin America's indigenous peoples had migrated from Asia. He also divided them into three barbarian categories. The Historia also described Inca and Aztec customs and history, as well as other information such as winds and tides, lakes, rivers, plants, animals, and mineral resources in the New World.

See also
Viceroyalty of Peru
List of Jesuit scientists
List of Roman Catholic scientist-clerics

References

 
 Adovasio, J. M. and David Pedler. "The Peopling of North America." North American Archaeology. Blackwell Publishing, 2005. p. 32.
 
 Jose de Acosta, S.J. (1540-1600) Pioneer of the Geophysical Sciences @Fairfield University

Bibliography
Acosta, José de (2002). The Natural and Moral History of the Indies. Edited by Jane Mangan; translated by Frances Lopez-Morillas. Durham, NC: Duke University Press. 
 BEROSE - International Encyclopaedia of the Histories of Anthropology. "Acosta, José de (1540-1600)", Paris, 2019. (ISSN 2648-2770)
Burgaleta, Claudio M. (1999). José de Acosta (1540–1600): His Life and Thought. Chicago: Loyola University Press. .
MacCormack, Sabine (1991). Religion in the Andes: Vision and Imagination in Early Colonial Peru. Princeton, NJ: Princeton University Press. .
Pagden, Anthony (1982). The Fall of Natural Man: The American Indian and the Origins of Comparative Ethnology. New York: Cambridge University Press. .
Pagden, Anthony (1993). European Encounters with the New World: From Renaissance to Romanticism. New Haven, CT: Yale University Press. .
Pino Díaz, Fermín del (2019). “Contribución del Padre José de Acosta a la constitución de la etnología: su evolucionismo”, in BEROSE - International Encyclopaedia of the Histories of Anthropology, Paris.
Pino Díaz, Fermín del (2019). “Vida y obra de José de Acosta, misionero jesuita y cronista indiano”, in BEROSE - International Encyclopaedia of the Histories of Anthropology, Paris.

Further reading 

 Ando, Clifford; McGinness, Anne; and MacCormack, Sabine G. (2015). “Natural Philosophy, History, and Theology in the Writings of José de Acosta, S.J. (1540–1600).” In Journal of Jesuit Studies 2(1): 1–35. doi.org/10.1163/22141332-00201001.

External links
 
 
 
 

1540 births
1600 deaths
Spanish scientists
Spanish Mesoamericanists
Novohispanic Mesoamericanists
16th-century Mesoamericanists
16th-century Spanish Jesuits
Jesuit scientists
16th-century anthropologists